Events from the year 1659 in England.

Incumbents
 Lord Protector – Richard Cromwell (until 25 May)
 Parliament – Third Protectorate (until 27 January, until 22 April), Protectorate Rump (starting 7 May, until 13 October), Second Commonwealth Rump (starting 26 December)

Events
 31 January - Central England temperature record begins monthly recording.
 16 February – the first known cheque (400 pounds) is written.
 22 April – Lord Protector Richard Cromwell is forced by the 'Wallingford House party' (grandees of the New Model Army) to disband the Parliament of England.
 25 April – Great fire in Southwold, Suffolk.
 7 May – Rump Parliament reassembles at the invitation of the Council of Officers and appoints a Committee of Safety to form the executive until a new Council of State is appointed on 19 May.
 22 May – Treaty of The Hague signed by France, Netherlands and England.
 25 May – Richard Cromwell resigns as Lord Protector.
 12 October – Rump Parliament dismisses General-major John Lambert and other generals. 
 13 October – Lambert excludes the Rump Parliament from the Palace of Westminster.
 26 December – Long Parliament reforms at Westminster.

Births
 1 January – Humphrey Hody, theologian and archdeacon (died 1707)
 26 March – William Wollaston, philosophical writer (died 1724)
 20 August – Henry Every, pirate

Deaths
 26 July – Mary Frith, cutpurse (born c.1584)
 20 September – Thomas Morton, deposed bishop (born 1564)
 31 October – John Bradshaw, judge (born 1602)

References

 
Years of the 17th century in England